is a Japanese manga artist born in Saitama Prefecture, Japan.

Biography
Tsukuba made her professional debut as a manga artist by winning the 'Outstanding Work' award in the 5th LaLa Mangaka Grand Prix held in 1994 for her work, . Her winning work was later published in the July 10th issue of LaLa DX in the same year. After Hikari no Dokeki Haru no Hi ni, she published a one-shot titled,  in the October issue of LaLa in the same year.

Her next work,  was published in the March 10th issue of Lunatic LaLa, one of LaLa's special issue in 1995.

Mermaid Moon was Tsukuba's next one-shot was published in the January 10th issue of LaLa DX in 1996. Four months later,  was published in the May 10th issue of the same magazine that published Mermaid Moon. It was later compiled into the second volume of her first series, Mekakushi no Kuni. Another one-shot,  was published in the November 10th issue of LaLa DX. This was compiled into the first volume of Mekakushi no Kuni.

Right after Bunny Game, another one-shot titled  was published and compiled into the first volume of Mekakushi no Kuni. Ame no Naka was also compiled into the third volume of Mekakushi no Kuni.

Her first series,  started serializing in the January issue of LaLa DX in 1999. The serialization continued in the same magazine for seven chapters, including one special chapter which was published in March issue of LaLa. Later the series was moved and continued in the August issue of LaLa in 2000 beginning from its eighth chapter. During the course of the serialization of Mekakushi no Kuni, three separate one-shots were serialized. It was compiled into the second volume of Tsukuba's second series, Yoroshiku Master.

For 2004, she came up with another new series titled  in the January issue of LaLa DX just as Mekakushi no Kuni ends in January issue of LaLa in 2004 with 40 chapters without including several special chapters. The series has 9 collected volumes in tankōbon format with 5 volumes in bunkōban format. After the end of Mekakushi no Kuni, Tsukuba published another one-shot titled,  in the May issue of LaLa before continuing Yoroshiku Master. Amai Kami Ato was also compiled into the first volume of Yoroshiku Master.

In the October issue of LaLa, she started another new series titled, . It ended in the January issue of LaLa in 2008, with 35 chapters without including a special chapter which was serialized in the November issue of LaLa DX in 2007. The chapter was compiled into the third volume of Yoroshiku Master. The series was compiled into 7 volumes in tankōbon format.

Yoroshiku Master is still ongoing as of October 2009, with 13 chapters compiled into 3 volumes. However, no new chapters were serialized since the January issue of LaLa DX.

Another two one-shots,  was published in the June issue of LaLa, while  was published in the September issue of LaLa DX.

For 2009, another one-shot,  was published in the January issue of LaLa  as well as making her official Melody debut by publishing a one-shot titled  in the October issue.

Personal life
Sakura Tsukuba was born on February 16 in Saitama Prefecture, Japan. She likes cooking, in which her favorite recipe is green curry. She also likes to do ethnic cooking. She likes both sweet and spicy food.

Works

One-shots
Mori no Koe
Tengoku Ichiban Chikai no Tō
Mermaid Moon
Hyakka Jimusho no Akuma
Matsuri no Ato
Bunny Game
Machigaeru Otoko
Shunkan no Raiōsha
Ame no Naka
Sennyū Rika-chan House
Sennyū! Inyō'ryō
Birthday Presents
Eden no Tobira
Amai Kami Ato
Tonari no Inuyama-kun
Shiro no Keiyaku
Hitomi Kara Destiny

Source:

Sent-in works
Hikari no Dokeki Haru no Hi ni

Source:

Series
Land of the Blindfolded (1998)
 (2005)
Penguin Revolution (2005)

Source:

References

External links
 Sakura Tsukuba manga at Media Arts Database 
Hakusensha's Interview with Sakura Tsukuba 
Hakusensha's Comicate issue 66 Interview with Sakura Tsukuba 
Hakusensha's Comicate issue 54: Fresh Talk - Meca Tanaka and Sakura Tsukuba 

Living people
Manga artists from Saitama Prefecture
Year of birth missing (living people)